Agroeca ornata is a species of liocranid sac spider in the family Liocranidae. It is found in the United States, Canada, and Russia.

References

Liocranidae
Articles created by Qbugbot
Spiders described in 1892
Taxa named by Nathan Banks